In Korean, gosu refers to a highly skilled person.

Gosu may also refer to:

 Pansori gosu, a drummer in pansori performances
 Gosu (programming language), an object-oriented, static typed programming language built on the Java Virtual Machine